St. Christopher Carrying the Christ Child is a painting by Hieronymus Bosch, dating to between 1490 and 1500. It resides at the Museum Boijmans Van Beuningen in Rotterdam, the Netherlands.

References

1490s paintings
Paintings by Hieronymus Bosch
Paintings in the collection of the Museum Boijmans Van Beuningen
Paintings depicting Jesus
Fish in art
Water in art